The 1st and 2nd divisions of the Campeonato Nacional Basquetebol - CNB are, respectively, the third and fourth basketball leagues in Portugal. They league were created in 2003.

Basketball competitions in Portugal